Jørgen "Benny" Nielsen (born 17 March 1951) is a Danish former football player. His position on the field was usually striker, although he also could play as midfielder. Nielsen played 28 matches for Denmark, scoring 7 goals. He made his début against Scotland in a 1–0 loss.

Nielsen started playing football with Brederød IF. He made his a-team début with AB. In 1971, he left Denmark for Belgium. His Belgian career took off immediately, with a hat trick in a cup match against SK Gullegem. One season later, fellow Dane Morten Olsen became Nielsen's teammate.

In 1974, Nielsen went to RWDM. The team became national champions that season. Just like with Cercle, Nielsen would also stay three seasons for the Brussels team RWDM, as he went to their main rivals Anderlecht. This was again quite a successful move, as Anderlecht won the UEFA Cup Winners' Cup that season. In 1981, Nielsen won the national title with Anderlecht. This was also his last season in Belgium. Nielsen ended his career with French side AS Saint-Étienne.

After retiring as a player he worked as a scout for Chelsea F.C. in Denmark. He managed Greve Fodbold from March 2012 until October 2012.

Honours

Player

RWD Molenbeek 

 Belgian First Division: 1974–75
 Jules Pappaert Cup: 1975
 Amsterdam Tournament: 1975

RSC Anderlecht'''
 Belgian First Division: 1980–81
 European Cup Winners' Cup: 1977–78 (winners)
 European Super Cup: 1978
Tournoi de Paris: 1977
 Jules Pappaert Cup: 1977
 Belgian Sports Merit Award: 1978

References

External links
Career stats
Danish national team profile
Cerclemuseum.be 

1951 births
Living people
Danish men's footballers
Denmark international footballers
Denmark youth international footballers
Denmark under-21 international footballers
Association football forwards
Akademisk Boldklub players
Cercle Brugge K.S.V. players
R.W.D. Molenbeek players
R.S.C. Anderlecht players
AS Saint-Étienne players
Belgian Pro League players
Ligue 1 players
Danish expatriate men's footballers
Expatriate footballers in Belgium
Expatriate footballers in France
Association football agents
People from Frederiksværk
Sportspeople from the Capital Region of Denmark